The 2010–11 season of Slovak Second League (also known as 2. liga) was the eighteen season of the third-tier football league in Slovakia, since its establishment in 1993. 32 teams were geographically divided into two groups: 2. liga západ and 2. liga východ (Western and Eastern) of 16 teams each. Teams will play only other teams in their own division.
From the next season was this league renamed to Slovak Third Football League (3. liga).

2. liga západ

Team changes from 2009–10
Promoted in 1. liga: ↑Senec↑
Relegated from 1. liga: ↓Prievidza×↓
Promoted in 2. liga: ↑Pezinok↑, ↑Šamorín↑
Relegated from 2. liga: ↓Dunajská Streda ↓

× - withdrew from league

Locations

League table

2. liga východ

Team changes from 2009–10
Promoted in 1. liga: ↑Moldava nad Bodvou↑
Relegated from 1. liga: ↓Podbrezová×↓
Promoted in 2. liga: ↑Bardejov↑, ↑Ružiná↑, ↑Dolná Ždaňa↑
Relegated from 2. liga: ↓Banská Bystrica↓, ↓Čadca↓

× - withdrew from league

Locations

League table

References

External links
 Slovak FA official site 

3
Slovak
3. Liga (Slovakia) seasons